Norman Cockram (27 August 1899 – 16 March 1973) was an Australian rules footballer who played with Fitzroy in the Victorian Football League (VFL).

Football
Cockram, a key position player, was originally from Northcote. He was Fitzroy's centre half-forward in their 1923 VFL Grand Final loss to Essendon.

Now playing as a fullback, Cockram returned to Northcote in 1929 and was a member of their premiership team that year. 

In 1932 he resumed his VFL career and he retired the following year. 

He was good enough to represent Victoria B on three occasions during his career.

Notes

References
 
 

1899 births
1973 deaths
Australian rules footballers from Melbourne
Australian Rules footballers: place kick exponents
Fitzroy Football Club players
Northcote Football Club players
People from Northcote, Victoria